Mount Henry is a summit in Alberta, Canada.

Mount Henry has the name of William Henry, a businessperson in the fur industry.

References

Henry
Alberta's Rockies